Vazhappally Padinjaru is a village in Kottayam district in the state of Kerala, India.

Demographics
 India census, Vazhappally Padinjaru had a population of 10849 with 5438 males and 5411 females.

References

Villages in Kottayam district
Changanassery
Vazhappally